Downend School is a coeducational secondary school and sixth form with academy status, situated on Westerleigh Road in the suburban village of Downend in South Gloucestershire, England.

About
The school has four houses: Carpenter (green), Brunel (red), Grace (blue) and Muller (yellow), each named after a different famous person from Bristol. Students are sorted into these house somewhat at random, though some allowance is made for siblings and friendships. Each house has house captains, which can consist of four house captains or two house and two vice. Generally these are two girls and two boys. The house is shown via the tie that each student wears, which has three stripes repeating down it, one thin white stripe, one thick navy stripe and one medium stripe which is the house colour. There is also the school logo on the tie (a shield with small images representing the houses).

In addition to the tie, the uniform consists of a navy blazer, the school logo situated on a pocket on the left. A white shirt is worn, along with dark grey tailored trousers and black leather shoes. There is also the option of wearing a dark grey skirt instead of trousers.

Facilities

The school is accessed through three sets of two gates, at the front, back and side of the school. Students, when entering and exiting the school, must pass through both gates.

The exception to this is at the front gates, in which visitors (and late students) may enter through the reception, and the sixth form, which is entered by passing only through the first front gate. The reason for these double gates is so that the inner gates can be closed to keep students in, while visitors are still able to enter and exit through the outer gates.

The school has several buildings, each containing different departments.

To the back it has several sports facilities, including a sports hall and several sports courts. The sports hall complex is run by the Circadian Trust.

In roughly the middle, there is a canteen, and just behind it is a major classroom block, which includes Maths, English and DT (design and technology).

To the left of the canteen are the science labs. The fire assembly point is behind the science block on the aforementioned courts.

At the front of the school, there is a building complex containing humanities, languages, and business classrooms as well as containing the administrative facilities.
Further included in this complex is the main hall and the gym, which are used for special occasions like open days, examinations and, in the 2019-(?) Coronavirus pandemic, for viral testing and vaccination.

To the far left of the school is the drama hall, where one of the three sets of gates are located.

CSET
Downend is part of an educational trust called Castle School Education Trust, named after Castle School.

Sixth Form
Downend and Mangotsfield share a sixth form, located in the Downend School premises.

The logo of this sixth Form is a 6 made up of various green shapes, including squares and a smaller 6.

Students at this sixth form are mainly from Downend or Mangotsfield School, though some come from other local schools.

The building is to the right of the primary front gate, and the entrance is just past the main school's secondary front gate. To enter this building, students must have a key card, marked with their name and a picture of themselves. This card expires when the student leaves the school at the end of year 13.

Contained within the building are staff and student toilets, the nine classrooms, the common room and a few staff offices. Eight of the classrooms are smaller, with one larger one. These are marked as P(1-9). Most rooms have a lime green colour scheme. One of these classrooms is a computer room, although the students also have access to laptops, available in the common room, which is by far the largest room in the building. This common room contains many chairs and tables, as well as leaflets for universities and other higher education opportunities, drawers for student possessions, and a small kitchenette containing a microwave and a kettle. Also located in the common room is a whiteboard where announcements are written, and where students are allowed to write as well.

Lessons like Maths and English generally take place within the sixth form building itself, whilst those requiring more specialised equipment or facilities, for example the sciences, take place within the main school. There are two exits at the back of the sixth form building that lead into the main school grounds, which do not require key cards.

History

Page School for Girls
Staple Hill Senior School for Girls was established in 1933, and in 1947 became Staple Hill Secondary Modern School, having separate departments for boys and girls. After the Chase Comprehensive School had been built for the boys in about 1966, the girls stayed in the buildings in North View, and it was renamed Page School for Girls.

Establishment
In September 1982, Page School for Girls merged with the coeducational Stockwell Hill Comprehensive School, and the new school was called Downend Comprehensive School.

Later years
It was renamed Downend Community School. In 2005, it moved to Westerleigh Road.

Tamryn Savage, was instated as head teacher for the school year beginning 2006 and onwards after the acting head teacher Ray Lockey retired.  She left at the end of the academic year 2010-2011 and was replaced by Will Roberts.
The buildings of Page School for Girls were demolished from 2007 to 2008.

The school converted to academy status on 1 March 2013.

Notable former pupils

Actor Mike Bailey, best known for playing the role of Sid Jenkins on Skins (TV series)
Sajid Javid, Conservative MP for Bromsgrove, formerly Secretary of State for Health and Social Care and Chancellor of the Exchequer
Chris Mason (darts player), Former professional darts player

References

External links
Official Site

Secondary schools in South Gloucestershire District
Educational institutions established in 1982
1982 establishments in England
Academies in South Gloucestershire District